Priske is a surname. Notable people with the surname include:

Brian Priske (born 1977), Danish soccer player
Rich Priske (1967–2020), Canadian bassist